The King's Academy is a private, Christian, coeducational, pre-kindergarten through grade twelve, college-preparatory school located in West Palm Beach, Florida. Established in 1970, it is run by an independent board of governors.

History

The King's Academy was founded by a group of Christian business leaders in August 1970 and opened on the campus of Belvedere Baptist Church in West Palm Beach, Florida. In 1971, the school purchased a 20-acre campus on Cherry Road where it remained until the 2004 school year. In August 2005, The King's Academy moved to its current 60 acre location at Belvedere Road and Sansbury's Way in Palm Beach County, Florida.

Since 1970, four presidents have overseen the day-to-day operations of the school: Kye Harris (1970–74), M. Nelson Loveland (1974–99), Jeffrey M. Loveland (1999–2016), and Randal L. Martin (2016–present). Since the school's inception, seven chairs of the board of governors have served: M. Nelson Loveland (1970–74), Lloyd Prouty (1974-75), Stanley F. Frederick (1975–87), Gene Martin (1987–93), David Fiebig (1993-2006), Clyde S. Meckstroth (2006–2019), and Steven T. Rasmussen (2019–present).

National awards and recognition

The King's Academy has received a number of national honors, including:

1986: The school received national recognition for excellence in education from President Ronald Reagan and U.S. Secretary of Education William Bennett as one of the top 60 private schools in the country.

1988: The band performed at the White House during President Ronald Reagan's term.

1989: On 20 January, the school's band students were selected to play for President George H. W. Bush and Vice President Dan Quayle at their inaugural parade.

2000: The school's fine arts students performed the world amateur premiere of Disney's Beauty and the Beast.

2007: Christian school researcher Dr. Gene Frost cited the school as one of the seven best Christian schools in America in his book, Learning from the Best: Growing Greatness in the Christian School.

2013: The school's fine arts students performed the world premiere of Disney's The Hunchback of Notre Dame (an English adaptation of the German-language musical Der Glöckner von Notre Dame).

2014: Dr. Frost reiterated the school's top seven national ranking.

2014: Arne Duncan, U.S. Secretary of Education for President Barack Obama, named the school a National Blue Ribbon School as an Exemplary High Performing School; one of 50 private schools to receive the honor.

2015: The National Football League named the school to its Super Bowl High School Honor Roll.

2016: The school's musical theatre program was named one of the nation's five best by the American High School Theatre Festival, winning the award for its performance of "Jekyll & Hyde."

2016: The school's boys golf team won a national championship at the Antigua National High School Golf Invitational in Scottsdale, Arizona; defeating the Utah state champion team by 11 strokes, the Arizona champion by 15 strokes, and the Illinois winner by 25 strokes.

2017: The school's choir and dance students were selected to perform for President Donald Trump and Vice President Mike Pence at their inaugural concert.

2017: The school's competitive cheerleading team earned National Grand Champion honors, defeating all teams, at the Fellowship of Christian Cheerleaders ("FCC") National Championships in Orlando, Florida.

2017: For a second time, the school's musical theatre program was named one of the nation's five best by the American High School Theatre Festival, winning the award for its performance of "Les Miserables."

2018: The school's competitive cheerleading team earned National Grand Champion honors for a second time, defeating all teams, at the Fellowship of Christian Cheerleaders ("FCC") National Championships in Orlando, Florida.

2019: The school's competitive cheerleading team earned National Grand Champion honors for a third time, defeating all teams, at the Fellowship of Christian Cheerleaders ("FCC") National Championships in Orlando, Florida.

2020: The school's competitive cheerleading team earned National Grand Champion honors for a fourth time, defeating all teams, at the Fellowship of Christian Cheerleaders ("FCC") National Championships.

2022: The school's competitive cheerleading team earned National Grand Champion honors for a fifth time, defeating all teams, at the Fellowship of Christian Cheerleaders ("FCC") National Championships.

2022: The school hosted the Fox News Hannity Town Hall Special Live Event which included Governor Ron DeSantis, US Senator Marco Rubio, and US Senator Rick Scott.

Academic profile

The King's Academy offers a college preparatory program for students from preschool to 12th grade. The King's Academy is fully accredited by four accrediting bodies: Southern Association of Colleges and Schools, AdvancED, the Association of Christian Schools International and the Florida Association of Christian Colleges and Schools. The school's most recent re-accreditation study was completed in 2013 and resulted in an extension of the school's accreditation through 2018.

Secondary school
The King's Academy's secondary school educates students from 7th to 12th grade. On average, 99% of The King's Academy's graduates enter college, with 96% of graduates matriculating into a four-year university or college. Other graduates commit to service in the United States military branches. The King's Academy offers 22 Advanced Placement courses and 21 hours of dual enrollment credits in partnership with Palm Beach Atlantic University. In 2017, the school's senior class (121 graduates) received college scholarships worth $7.3 million.

Business Magnet Program

In 2013, the school established a business track for high school students. Business-minded students can earn a certificate of completion by taking electives in American entrepreneurship, economics, ethics, foreign language, marketing and statistics; while being a member of Future Business Leaders of America (FBLA-PBL).

STEM Magnet Program

In 2015, the school established a STEM magnet program for high school and elementary students, offering an academically rigorous science, technology, engineering and math curriculum. Students that complete the STEM track receive a certificate of completion.

DiMino Engineering Magnet Program

In 2018, Frank DiMino gifted $1 million to endow the school’s engineering track; thus establishing the DiMino Engineering Program.

O'Keeffe Pre-Law Magnet Program

In 2016, the school established a pre-law track for high school students. Students interested in the field of law can earn a certificate of completion by taking six electives in law-related classes including Introduction to Law, Constitutional Law, Business Law I and II, Criminal Law, and Oral & Written Advocacy. In 2018, the Esther B. O'Keeffe Foundation donated $1 million to the Pre-Law Program, and King's named the program after the foundation.

Sports Medicine Magnet Program

In 2017, the school established a sports medicine track for high school students. Students interested in the field of athletic training can earn a certificate of completion by taking five electives in sports medicine-related classes including First Aid & Safety, Care & Prevention of Athletic Injuries, Health Explorations I Honors, Health Explorations II Honors, and Anatomy and Physiology Honors.

Christian Ministry Magnet Program

In 2017, the school established a Christian ministry track for high school students. Students interested in a future career in ministry can earn a certificate of completion by enrolling and successfully completing three advanced biblical electives including Interpreting the Bible, Introduction to Christian Ministry, and Evangelism and Apologetics.

Computer Science Magnet Program

In 2018, the school established a computer science designation for students in grades nine to twelve. Students inspired to study the subject can complete the courses of Computer Programming, Web Design, and AP Computer Principals in order to receive the distinction.

Elementary school
The King's Academy's elementary school educates students from pre-Kindergarten to 6th grade. The school's elementary students' average scores ranked in the top 15 percent of private schools nationally for 2013 and 2014 academic standardized testing; qualifying the school as a Blue Ribbon Elementary School according to the U.S. Department of Education. As a result, the school was named a 2014 National Blue Ribbon School. In addition to academic subjects, the School's elementary program provides instruction in art, band, cognitive development, Latin, music appreciation, physical education, Spanish, science laboratory, technology and vocal music. Optional after-school extracurricular activities are offered for athletic and fine arts development.

Athletics

The King's Academy's Lions athletics program competes in the following sports: Baseball, Basketball, Bowling, Cheerleading, Cross Country, Football, Golf, Lacrosse, Swimming, Soccer, Softball, Tennis, Track & Field, and Volleyball.

As a full member of the Florida High School Athletic Association (FHSAA), the school fields approximately 50 boys and girls teams in 23 FHSAA-sanctioned varsity sports. In 2014, The King's Academy joined the independent Southeastern Football Conference for football only.

Team championships
In 1992, The King's Academy's baseball team defeated Tallahassee Maclay for the school's first Florida state championship, and won another state title in 2001. The King's Academy volleyball team won the Florida state title in 1993, in 1994, and again in 2006. The King's Academy competitive cheerleading team won five consecutive FHSAA state championships from 2010 to 2014 and a sixth in 2019.

In 2016, The King's Academy's boys' golf team won the school's first national championship at the Antigua National High School Golf Invitational in Scottsdale, Arizona. The school's competitive cheerleading team earned National Grand Champion and FHSAA Public School Champion honors at the 2017 through 2020 FCC National Championships in Orlando, Florida.

In all, varsity teams competing for The King's Academy have won 129 FHSAA district championships, 45 FHSAA regional titles, 3 football conference titles, 1 Palm Beach County championship, 11 FHSAA state championships, and 5 national championships:

(*) National title.
(**) State runner-up.
(^) FCC Division championship.
(^^) Southeastern Football Conference championship.
(^^^) Palm Beach County championship.

Individual Championships

While competing for The King's Academy, student-athletes have won 32 individual state and national athletic titles in track, swimming, and golf:

(*) National champion.

Athletic facilities
The King's Academy's football, soccer and lacrosse teams play home games on campus at Kahlert Stadium, a lighted, natural turf facility with seating for 1,500 fans. Lion and Lady Lion volleyball and basketball teams compete in the M. Nelson Loveland Athletic Center's gymnasium, which houses a game court and two practice courts and has seating for 800 spectators. The School's property also contains lighted baseball and softball fields, a track and field facility with seating for 300, six competition tennis courts and a USATF certified 5-K cross-country course. In 2015, the school built the Full-Page Aquatic Center, comprising a 25-meter competition swimming pool and pool house, for use by its swimming teams. Since 2016 the schools varsity boys soccer team has made it to the championship, this was the first year they haven't.

On-campus athletic training facilities include a field house with weight and athletic training rooms, a covered basketball and volleyball pavilion, a golf practice facility, and three prescription athletic turf practice fields (football, multi-purpose and lacrosse). In all, The King's Academy maintains 15 acres of natural turf fields for its athletic program.

The Smith Family Conservatory of the Arts
The King's Academy offers a comprehensive arts education to its preschool through high school students. Students perform in Broadway-style musicals, His People and His Voice choirs, jazz, concert and marching bands, percussion, strings and dance ensembles, visual arts, broadcasting, film and digital arts, and stagecraft. They can also earn diploma distinctions in theatre arts, instrumental arts, vocal arts, dance arts, visual arts, and digital arts. In 2016 and 2017, the school's conservatory program was ranked in the top five schools nationally by the American High School Theatre Festival.

Kidservatory
Pre-kindergarten through third grade students are taught music theory and receive beginning vocal training. They also participate in basic visual art classes.Once students enter the 4th grade they get to chose what they participate in, choir, art, strings, dance, piano, or band.

Junior Conservatory
Students in fourth through eighth grade are given the opportunity to enroll and perform in theatre arts, instrumental arts including piano laboratory, vocal arts and dance arts classes and shows.

Theatre Arts
In April 2013, the school's students performed the world premiere of Disney's The Hunchback of Notre Dame (an English adaptation of the German-language musical Der Glöckner von Notre Dame). This performance was made in collaboration with Walt Disney Executive Studios. After viewing the performance, Disney executive Brian Turwilliger commented, "The story was so beautifully crafted and displayed in new and fresh ways." He explained that Disney will now offer The Hunchback of Notre Dame to be performed at other schools and amateur theaters, as it did with Beauty and the Beast after another Disney-The King's Academy collaboration in 2000 resulted in the world amateur stage premiere of the musical.

In 2015, the school's production of The Sound of Music was featured on an episode of ABC News' 20/20. The school's production of Jekyll & Hyde earned a 2016 top high school musical theatre program award from the American High School Theatre Festival and an invitation to perform Les Misérables at the 2017 Fringe Festival in London, England and Edinburgh, Scotland. In 2017, the school earned a second top theatre program award for its productions of "Les Miserables" and "Funny Girl." In 2018, the school premiered the nation's first high school production of Disney's Newsies (the musical).

Other recent stage productions have included:

Instrumental Arts

The King's Academy offers instrumental classes for elementary students starting with beginning band in 5th grade and intermediate band in 6th grade. Secondary students may choose to continue their studies in the school's concert and symphonic bands. The King's Academy also offers classes in woodwinds, percussion and strings.

The King's Regiment
The school's marching and parade band, The King's Regiment (formerly known as the Marching Lions) is a 3-time state runner-up (2008, 2010 and 2012) in Class A at the Florida Marching Band Championships. In 2013, the Marching Lions finished 10th in the nation (Class A) at the Bands of America's Grand National Championships, held at Indianapolis' Lucas Oil Stadium.

Recent performances by The King's Regiment have included:

Prior performances by the Marching Lions included:

Notable alumni

 A 2007 graduate of the school, Emmanuel Lamur played linebacker in the National Football League for the Cincinnati Bengals and Minnesota Vikings., and currently plays for the Oakland Raiders. He played college football at Kansas State University. His twin brother Sammuel Lamur '07 also graduated from The King's Academy, played at Kansas State and is a quarterback for the Tampa Bay Storm in the Arena Football League.
 Mike “Mikie” Miller, graduated from The King’s Acadmey in 2010. Miller is a former College Football Quarterback at UAB and currently serves as the Offensive Coordinator and QB’s Coach at Charlotte. Miller has coached at Clemson, Alabama and Maryland before being hired at Charlotte as the Offensive Coordinator. Miller was named to 247Sports 30 under 30 top rising stars in college football and the AFCA 35 under 35 Coaches Leadership Institute. He is married to the former Megan Kintz who also attended King’s and graduated in 2012. 
 Heath Evans, graduated from King's in '97 and is a former NFL player and NFL Network host. He played at Auburn University, and drafted in 2001 to the Seattle Seahawks. Evans then signed with the Miami Dolphins in the spring of 2005. Not long into the season, the New England Patriots signed Evans for the remainder of the 2005 season. An unrestricted free agent in the 2009 offseason, Evans was signed by the New Orleans Saints on 5 March and earned his Super Bowl ring. He retired in August 2011 and joined the NFL Network until 2018.
Lauren Jelencovich graduated from The King's Academy in 2003 and is a professional soprano singer.
Colt Morton graduated from The King's Academy in 2000 and was a Major League Baseball catcher for the San Diego Padres. He played college baseball at North Carolina State University.
Rachel Rossin graduated from The King's Academy in 2005. She studied graphic design and art history at Florida State University, where she also founded The Greenhouse Project to benefit Uganda's Greenhouse Orphanage. She is a multimedia artist who works in oil painting, installation, and digital programming (CAD and virtual reality). Rossin is a virtual reality fellow in residence at New Inc., New Museum's art incubator. Recent solo exhibits of her work have been held at Elliott Levenglick Gallery, New York; Signal, Brooklyn; Spring/Break Art Show, New York; Schoolhouse Projects with Ideas City, New York; and the Cummer Museum of Art and Gardens, Jacksonville, Florida. Her virtual reality work was reviewed in the New York Times.
Emin Toro, is an American Lawyer and a nominee to be a U.S. Tax Court Judge. After graduating from King's in '93, he went to the honors program at Palm Beach Atlantic University and then to law school at the University of North Carolina. Following law school, Toro clerked for Judge Karen L. Henderson of the United States Court of Appeals for the District of Columbia Circuit and Associate Justice Clarence Thomas of the Supreme Court of the United States. Toro is a Fellow of the American College of Tax Counsel. He currently is a partner at Covington & Burling.

Notable faculty

Jarrod Saltalamacchia is the school's varsity baseball coach. Coach Salty was drafted straight out of High School in the First Round of the 2003 MLB Draft by the Atlanta Braves. He went on to win the 2005 Minor League Player of the Year and was a Minor League All-Star. During those years he competed and won 3 Gold Medals with Team USA in 2000, 2003, and 2005. He then went on to play for the Texas Rangers from 2007-2010 before being traded to the Boston Red Sox. He helped the Red Sox win the 2013 World Series Championship. Jarrod was also named that same year the 2013 Palm Beach County Professional Player of the Year. Until retiring in 2019, Salty had stints with the Marlins, Diamondbacks, Tigers, and Blue Jays. Jarrod was just recently named an inductee in the 2020 Palm Beach County Sports Hall of Fame.

Campus

The King's Academy is located on approximately 60 acres at the northeast corner of Belvedere Road and Sansbury's Way in Palm Beach County, Florida. Most of the campus was constructed in 2005 and consists of 16 buildings (Lower Elementary, Administration, Upper Elementary, High School Administration, High School Science, High School Education, M. Nelson Loveland Athletic Center, Elementary Music, Cafeteria, Rosemary Beaumont Library, Field House, Bus Garage/Maintenance, Events Center (completed in 2012), Full-Page Aquatic Center (completed in 2015), Page Family Center for Performing Arts (completed in 2017), and Boswell Science & Technology Center (completed in 2018)) encompassing approximately 225,000 square feet.

In 2015, the school added Studio 70, a television broadcasting facility.

Remote locations
The school also operates The King's Academy Preschool at remote locations in Boynton Beach, Greenacres, Loxahatchee, Palm Beach Gardens, and Royal Palm Beach, Florida; at the Boynton Beach Community Church, Church in the Palms' Community Center, Trinity West Church, Cross Community Church, and Connect Church of Royal Palm, respectively.

Online learning
In 2010, The King's Academy established an internet-based school for middle and high school students called The King's Academy Online. The online program offers approximately 140 courses, with advanced placement courses and dual enrollment credits from Christian institutions including Indiana Wesleyan University and Taylor University.

Publications
The King's Academy publishes student-produced elementary (EL) and high school (HS) yearbooks (both named The Sceptre) annually, monthly student-written newspapers (Roar, formerly The Lion Ledger and The Scroll) and semi-annual magazines (The Chronicle). During the school year, the school also issues a weekly online edition of TKA E-News.
 
From 2014 to 2016, the school's yearbook program was named a Jostens National Yearbook Program of Excellence.

Recent yearbooks have included:

From the school's inception to 2015, its yearbooks were as follows:

References

External links
Official Website: The King's Academy - West Palm Beach

Christian schools in Florida
Educational institutions established in 1970
Private elementary schools in Florida
Private middle schools in Florida
Private high schools in Florida
Nondenominational Christian schools in the United States
Schools in Palm Beach County, Florida
High schools in Palm Beach County, Florida
Buildings and structures in West Palm Beach, Florida